Newtown was a parliamentary borough located in Newtown on the Isle of Wight, which was represented in the House of Commons of England until 1707, then in the House of Commons of Great Britain from 1707 to 1800, and finally in the House of Commons of the United Kingdom from 1801 to 1832. It was represented by two members of parliament (MPs), elected by the bloc vote system.

The borough was abolished in the Great Reform Act of 1832, and from the 1832 general election its territory was included in the new county constituency of Isle of Wight.

History

Newtown, located on the large natural harbour on the north-western coast of the Isle of Wight, was the first borough established in the county. A French raid in 1377, which destroyed much of the town as well as other settlements on the island, sealed its permanent decline. By the mid-16th century it was a small settlement long eclipsed by the more easily defended town of Newport. To try to stimulate economic development, Elizabeth I awarded the town two parliamentary seats.

Newtown was a burgage borough, meaning that the right to vote was vested solely in the owners of a specified number of properties or "burgage tenements". At the time of the Great Reform Act of 1832 there were 39 burgage tenements, held by 23 burgesses; however, most of these held only life grants. It was common practice for life grants to be made to friends of the proprietors so as to ensure that the full voting power could be exercised; if these nominees failed to vote as expected, they could be ejected and replaced by somebody more reliable before the next election. These voters were often non-resident – and indeed, it could hardly be otherwise, for although there were 39 burgage tenements, there were only 14 houses. Unlike many rotten boroughs, no single landowner controlled a majority of the burgages: the reversionary rights in them belonged to three families (Barrington, Holmes and Anderson-Pelham), with none having an overall majority. Elections in the borough consequently required careful management and sometimes considerable expenditure to achieve the desired result. In the 1750s and 1760s, the arrangement was that one of the two seats was considered to be in the gift of the Barrington family, while Thomas Holmes (who also nursed the other two Isle of Wight boroughs, Newport and Yarmouth, for the government) negotiated the election of the government's nominee for the other, unless he wanted it for a member of the Holmes family.

By 1831, the borough had a population of just 68, and it was disestablished the following year by the Reform Act.

Members of Parliament

1584–1640

1640–1832 

Notes

References
 D Brunton & D H Pennington, "Members of the Long Parliament" (London: George Allen & Unwin, 1954)
Cobbett's Parliamentary history of England, from the Norman Conquest in 1066 to the year 1803 (London: Thomas Hansard, 1808) 
 D Englefield, J Seaton & I White, Facts About the British Prime Ministers (London: Mansell, 1995)
 J Holladay Philbin, Parliamentary Representation 1832 – England and Wales (New Haven: Yale University Press, 1965)
 Henry Stooks Smith, "The Parliaments of England from 1715 to 1847" (2nd edition, edited by FWS Craig – Chichester: Parliamentary Reference Publications, 1973)

See also
Isle of Wight
Newport (Isle of Wight) (UK Parliament constituency)
Politics of the Isle of Wight
Parliamentary representation from Isle of Wight

Politics of the Isle of Wight
Parliamentary constituencies in South East England (historic)
Constituencies of the Parliament of the United Kingdom established in 1584
Constituencies of the Parliament of the United Kingdom disestablished in 1832
Rotten boroughs